Cardiff Three may refer to:
 the three Cardiff men wrongfully convicted of  the 1987 murder of newsagent Phillip Saunders
 the three Cardiff men wrongfully convicted of the 1988 murder of Lynette White